Hittin' the Road may refer to:

 Hittin' the Road (Outlaws album), 1993
 Hittin' the Road (Ernest Tubb album), 1965
 Hittin' the Road (Chance McKinney album)